Tskhiloni (also known as Антъоныхъæу) is an Ossetian village in Akhalgori Municipality, Mtskheta-Mtianeti Georgia. Village has two parts — Zemo (Upper) Tskhiloni and Kvemo (Lower) Tskhiloni.

Notable people 
Besik Kudukhov, a freestyle wrestling Olympic Games champion.

References

Populated places in Akhalgori District